Jérôme Junior Onguéné (born 22 December 1997) is a Cameroonian professional footballer who plays for Red Bull Salzburg on loan from German Bundesliga club Eintracht Frankfurt and the Cameroon national team.

Club career
On 31 January 2017, Onguéné moved to VfB Stuttgart. He was loaned to FC Red Bull Salzburg on 31 August 2017 until the end of the season. In June 2018 Onguéné moved permanently to Salzburg.

On 15 January 2021, Onguéné moved to Serie A club Genoa, on a loan until the end of the season. The loan included an option to buy.

On 25 March 2022, Onguéné signed a five-year contract with Eintracht Frankfurt in Germany, effective 1 July 2022. On 5 January 2023, Onguéné returned to Red Bull Salzburg on loan until the end of the season having failed to make an appearance for Frankfurt.

International career
Onguéné won the 2016 UEFA European Under-19 Championship with France. In August 2018 Onguéné switched his allegiance to Cameroon and was nominated for the match against Comoros in the 2019 Africa Cup of Nations qualification Group B. He made his debut for Cameroon in a 1–0 win over Malawi national football team on 12 October 2018.

Career statistics

Club

Honours
Red Bull Salzburg
Austrian Champion: 2017–18, 2018–19, 2019–20, 2020–21, 2021–22
Austrian Cup: 2019, 2020, 2021
France U19
UEFA European Under-19 Championship: 2016
Cameroon
 Africa Cup of Nations bronze: 2021

References

External links

1997 births
Living people
Cameroonian footballers
Cameroon international footballers
French footballers
France youth international footballers
Cameroonian emigrants to France
FC Sochaux-Montbéliard players
VfB Stuttgart players
FC Red Bull Salzburg players
Genoa C.F.C. players
Eintracht Frankfurt players
Ligue 2 players
Austrian Football Bundesliga players
Serie A players
Association football defenders
Cameroonian expatriate footballers
French expatriate footballers
Cameroonian expatriate sportspeople in Germany
French expatriate sportspeople in Germany
Cameroonian expatriate sportspeople in Austria
French expatriate sportspeople in Austria
Cameroonian expatriate sportspeople in Italy
French expatriate sportspeople in Italy
Expatriate footballers in Germany
Expatriate footballers in Austria
Expatriate footballers in Italy
Naturalized citizens of France
French sportspeople of Cameroonian descent
People from Centre Region (Cameroon)
2021 Africa Cup of Nations players